Baba Zeyd (also Romanized as Bābā Zeyd; also known as Bāvāzeyd and Bawāzid) is a village in Howmeh Rural District, in the Central District of Harsin County, Kermanshah Province, Iran. At the 2006 census, its population was 635, in 147 families.

References 

Populated places in Harsin County